Fragment-based lead discovery (FBLD) also known as fragment-based drug discovery (FBDD) is a method used for finding lead compounds as part of the drug discovery process. Fragments are small organic molecules which are small in size and low in molecular weight. It is based on identifying small chemical fragments, which may bind only weakly to the biological target, and then growing them or combining them to produce a lead with a higher affinity. FBLD can be compared with high-throughput screening (HTS). In HTS, libraries with up to millions of compounds, with molecular weights of around 500 Da, are screened, and nanomolar binding affinities are sought. In contrast, in the early phase of FBLD, libraries with a few thousand compounds with molecular weights of around 200 Da may be screened, and millimolar affinities can be considered useful. FBLD is a technique being used in research for discovering novel potent inhibitors. This methodology could help to design multitarget drugs for multiple diseases. The multitarget inhibitor approach is based on designing an inhibitor for the multiple targets. This type of drug design opens up new polypharmacological avenues for discovering innovative and effective therapies. Neurodegenerative diseases like Alzheimer’s (AD) and Parkinson’s, among others, also show rather complex etiopathologies. Multitarget inhibitors are more appropriate for addressing the complexity of AD and may provide new drugs for controlling the multifactorial nature of AD, stopping its progression.

Library design 

In analogy to the rule of five, it has been proposed that ideal fragments should follow the 'rule of three' (molecular weight < 300, ClogP < 3, the number of hydrogen bond donors and acceptors each should be < 3 and the number of rotatable bonds should be < 3).  Since the fragments have relatively low affinity for their targets, they must have high water solubility so that they can be screened at higher concentrations.

Library screening and quantification 

In fragment-based drug discovery, the low binding affinities of the fragments pose significant challenges for screening. Many biophysical techniques have been applied to address this issue. In particular, ligand-observe nuclear magnetic resonance (NMR) methods such as water-ligand observed via gradient spectroscopy (waterLOGSY), saturation transfer difference spectroscopy (STD-NMR), 19F NMR spectroscopy and inter-ligand Overhauser effect (ILOE) spectroscopy, protein-observe NMR methods such as 1H-15N heteronuclear single quantum coherence (HSQC) that utilises isotopically-labelled proteins, surface plasmon resonance (SPR), isothermal titration calorimetry (ITC) and Microscale Thermophoresis (MST) are routinely-used for ligand screening and for the quantification of fragment binding affinity to the target protein. At modern X-ray crystallography synchrotron beamlines, several hundred data sets of protein-ligand complex crystal structures can be obtained within 24 hours. This technology makes crystallographic fragment screening possible, i.e. the use of X-ray crystallography directly for the fragment screening step.

Once a fragment (or a combination of fragments) have been identified, protein X-ray crystallography is used to obtain structural models of the protein- complexes. Such information can then be used to guide organic synthesis for high-affinity protein ligands and enzyme inhibitors.

Advantages over traditional libraries 

Advantages of screening low molecular weight fragment based libraries over traditional higher molecular weight chemical libraries are several.   These include:
 More hydrophilic hits in which hydrogen bonding is more likely to contribute to affinity (enthalpically driven binding).  It is generally much easier to increase affinity by adding hydrophobic groups (entropically driven binding); starting with a hydrophilic ligand increases the chances that the final optimized ligand will not be too hydrophobic (log P  < 5).
 Higher ligand efficiency so that the final optimized ligand will more likely be relatively low in molecular weight (MW < 500).
 Since two to three fragments in theory can be combined to form an optimized ligand, screening a fragment library of N compounds is equivalent to screening N2 - N3 compounds in a traditional library.
 Fragments are less likely to contain sterically blocking groups that interfere with an otherwise favorable ligand-protein interaction, increasing the combinatorial advantage of a fragment library even further.

See also 
 Druglikeness
 Protein-directed dynamic combinatorial chemistry
 Lipinski's rule of five

References

Further reading 

 
 
 
 
 

Download an example of a Fragment based library here (4,532 compounds, zipped SD-File)

Drug discovery
Biotechnology